Billy Spivey (born 1969) is an American politician who was a Republican member of the Tennessee House of Representatives for the 92nd district from 2012 to November 2016

Biography

Early life
He was born on January 18, 1969. He received an A.A.S. from Columbia State Community College in Columbia, Tennessee. He was in the United States Army during the 1990-1991 Gulf War with the 1st Cavalry Division. He also graduated from the Leadership Marshall County.

Career
During his time in the Tennessee House, he played a pivotal role in phasing out the Hall income tax. He was also a central figure in replacing Common Core in Tennessee with an alternative crafted by Tennessee-based educators and experts.

He currently works as a maintenance manager.

He is the former chairman of the Marshall County Republican Party and a former member of the Tennessee Technology Center advisory board. He lost his first run against Democratic congressman Eddie Bass. From November 2012, he was the state congressman for the 92nd district of Tennessee. He won the election against Vicki Cain, who was chair of the Marshall County Chamber of Commerce. In the Tennessee House, he was a member of the House Agriculture and Natural Resources Committee, the House State Government Committee and the House Agriculture and Natural Resources Subcommittee. He is also a past chairman of the Marshall County Commission. He expressed his concern about handing the Nickajack Reservoir over to the state of Georgia.

Spivey is a member of the Tennessee State Guard.

Personal life
He married Kim Spivey, a school teacher, and they raised six daughters. He is a Reformed Baptist.

References

Living people
1969 births
United States Army personnel of the Gulf War
Republican Party members of the Tennessee House of Representatives
21st-century American politicians